Solute carrier family 2, facilitated glucose transporter member 6 is a protein that in humans is encoded by the SLC2A6 gene.

Function 

Hexose transport into mammalian cells is catalyzed by a family of membrane proteins, including SLC2A6, that contain 12 transmembrane domains and a number of critical conserved residues.[supplied by OMIM]

See also 
 Glucose transporter
 Solute carrier family

References

Further reading 

 
 
 
 

Solute carrier family